Judy Williams is a female former international table tennis player from England.

Table tennis career
She represented England at the 1969 World Table Tennis Championships in the Corbillon Cup (women's team event) with Karenza Mathews, Jill Shirley and Mary Shannon-Wright.

She was also the 1969 English National Table Tennis Championships singles champion and represented Sussex at county level.

See also
 List of England players at the World Team Table Tennis Championships

References

English female table tennis players
Living people
Year of birth missing (living people)